Yugpurush is a 1998 Indian Drama film directed by Partho Ghosh and produced by Vijay Mehta. The film stars Nana Patekar, Jackie Shroff and Manisha Koirala in the title roles. It is an adaptation of Fyodor Dostoyevsky's novel The Idiot.

Cast
Nana Patekar - Anirudh Desai
Jackie Shroff - Ranjan Duara
Manisha Koirala - Sunita Jaiswal
Ashwini Bhave - Deepti Khurana
Mohnish Bahl - Mohnish Vaswani
Yashwant Dutt - Yeshwant Dutt
Shivaji Satam - Paresh Kumar
Mohan Joshi - Mohan Kapoor
Sulbha Deshpande - Mrs. Simran Mohan

Plot

Anirudh (Nana Patekar) is released from a facility that treats patients with mental ailments. Anirudh also happens to be an exceptional artist and does portraits of new people he meets. As he struggles with adjusting with the "normal" world, he encounters Sunita (Manisha Koirala), an escort and Ranjan (Jackie Shroff), the son of a renowned politician. Ranjan, is madly in love with Sunita, but Sunita does not feel the same way about him. Anirudh is the only person to see beyond Sunita's seemingly comfortable and affluent existence and knows that deep down she is extremely sad and alone. They develop a special bond of friendship despite their vastly different personalities and backgrounds. Anirudh also becomes good friends with Ranjan. Ranjan is a good-hearted but egotistical man who cannot bear even the thought of failure in any aspect of his life. Can he handle Sunita's rejection? Can he deal with the fact that Sunita feels closer to Anirudh than him? Will Sunita find happiness? And, most importantly, will Anirudh survive in this "sane" world?

Music

The music of the film was composed by Rajesh Roshan and Amar Parshuram Haldipur, while the sound mixing was done by Hitendra Ghosh and Buta Singh. The lyrics of the film were penned by Majrooh Sultanpuri under the music company T-Series.

Track listing

References

External links
 

1990s Hindi-language films
Films scored by Rajesh Roshan
Films directed by Partho Ghosh
Films based on The Idiot
Films based on works by Fyodor Dostoyevsky